(1155–1213) was an influential Buddhist scholar-monk and reformer of the East Asian Yogācāra sect in Japan, posthumously known as .

Jōkei was a prolific author, asserting and compiling the Yogācāra doctrine while simultaneously refuting newer movements, particularly the Pure Land movement begun by Hōnen. Like his contemporary Myōe, Jōkei sought to make Buddhism more accessible to the public through the promotion of rebirth to Mount Potalaka, the dwelling of the bodhisattva Kannon, or aspiring for rebirth in Tushita, where the bodhisattva Maitreya dwells.  Jōkei actively promoted devotion to Gautama Buddha, the historical founder, through devotional practices, access to śarīra (relics of the Buddha), and promotion of the traditional monastic code, the Vinaya.

Biography 

Jōkei was born into the prestigious, but rapidly declining Fujiwara at a time when the Taira clan was gaining ascendancy.  Due to his father's and grandfather's involvement with Emperor Go-Shirakawa and the Minamoto clan, the former was exiled while the latter was killed as depicted in The Tale of the Heike. Jōkei and his siblings took Buddhist tonsure, and Jōkei was admitted to the temple of Kōfuku-ji, the tutelary temple of the Fujiwara, at the age of 11.

Jōkei rapidly rose to prominence for his understanding of Hosso doctrine, and records show that starting in 1186, he delivered lectures on Buddhist texts such as the Lotus Sutra, and the Greater Perfection of Wisdom Sutra (daihannya kyō 大般若経).  Prominent aristocrat, and chancellor to the Emperor Go-Shirakawa, Fujiwara no Kanezane, described his exposition of the Dharma as "profound", but his voice was so soft that it was difficult to hear.

By 1192, Jōkei made an unexpected move by moving to a remote temple named Kasagidera northeast of Nara and the Kofukuji hierarchy.  His move was lamented by Kanezane among others, and even Myoe his contemporary records a dream where the deity of Kasuga-taisha (once part of Kofukuji's temple complex), came to him in a dream protesting Jōkei's departure.  Research tentatively shows that Jōkei intended to devote more time to study of Buddhist texts, and complete a project to copy the Greater Perfection of Wisdom Sutra, or devote more time to his devotion of the bodhisattva of Maitreya.

Time spent at Kasagidera records numerous building projects, ceremonies, and campaigns to rebuild temples decimated by the Genpei War (including Kōfuku-ji) as well as many recorded lectures. Contrary to his intended seclusion, Jōkei actually spent considerable time visiting Kyoto and Nara by request to officiate ceremonies or deliver lectures. The petition singled out the exclusive-nembutsu practice of Hōnen, defending the traditional Mahayana position, while requesting that the government put a stop to the rapidly growing movement and followers who allegedly defamed Buddhism and were guilty of antinomianism.

In 1208, Jōkei retired to a temple named Fudaraku Kannonji, later renamed to Kaijūsenji. The final five years of Jōkei's life represent a very active time in his life, when he attempted to reach a doctrinal reconciliation between the Hosso and Tendai sects, who had been bitter rivals since the time of Tokuitsu and Tendai founder Saichō. Jōkei additionally led a successful revival movement to restore discipline in the monastic community that had declined in the late Heian period, with emphasis on traditional monastic code, or Prātimokṣa. Jōkei restored Vinaya lineages to Kofukuji, Tōshōdai-ji and other temples by 1210, while he gained a number of prominent disciples including Eison, through Jōkei's disciple Kainyo, who went on to found the Shingon Risshu sect, and Ryohen, the so-called "Hosso restorer".

References

Bibliography 
 
 
 
 

Kamakura period Buddhist clergy